Pietro Filippo Scarlatti (5 January 1679 – 22 February 1750) was an Italian composer, organist, and choirmaster.

He was born in Rome, the eldest of Alessandro Scarlatti's children and a brother of composer Domenico Scarlatti and began his musical career in 1705 as choirmaster of the cathedral of Urbino. Three years later, in 1708, his father brought him to Naples, where he became an organist at court. In 1728, his only opera Clitarco was premiered at Naples' Teatro San Bartolomeo; the score has been lost. His other principal works include three cantatas and a multitude of keyboard toccatas, one of which was recorded by Luciano Sgrizzi. He died in Naples in 1750.

1679 births
1750 deaths
18th-century Italian composers
18th-century keyboardists
18th-century Italian male musicians
Italian Baroque composers
Italian male classical composers
Italian opera composers
Italian classical organists
Male opera composers
Male classical organists
Musicians from Rome
People of Sicilian descent